The 2008–09 First League of the Republika Srpska season was the fourteenth since its establishment.

Clubs and stadiums

League standings

See also
2008–09 First League of the Federation of Bosnia and Herzegovina

Bos
2
First League of the Republika Srpska seasons